South Side School may refer to:

South Side School (Sarasota, Florida), listed on the National Register of Historic Places (NRHP)
South Side School (Fort Lauderdale, Florida), NRHP-listed
South Side School (Geneseo, Illinois), NRHP-listed

See also
Southside High School (disambiguation), including places named "South Side High School"